The planetary health diet is a flexitarian diet created by the EAT-Lancet commission as part of a report released in The Lancet on 16 January 2019. The aim of the report and the diet it developed is to create dietary paradigms that have the following aims:

 To feed a world's population of 10 billion people in 2050
 To greatly reduce the worldwide number of deaths caused by poor diet
 To be environmentally sustainable as to prevent the collapse of the natural world

Restrictions 
To achieve this, it has defined heavy restrictions on the consumption of meat, dairy, and starchy vegetables, specifically red meat. The aim of this is not only to lessen the impact of the meat and dairy industries on the environment, but also to, theoretically, drastically decrease saturated fat and sugar intake from these food groups.<ref name= Today's consumption of meat and dairy often exceeds nutritional recommendations.

Healthy diets have an optimal caloric intake and consist largely of a diversity of plant-based foods, low amounts of animal source foods, contain unsaturated rather than saturated fats, and limited amounts of refined grains, highly processed foods and added sugars. 

There are also other restrictions on the amount of fruit, vegetables, legumes, grains, and oil. This is because the diet is created around a total intake of 2,500 calories a day (i.e., to discourage overeating). But the main focus is on greatly reducing meat, eggs, dairy, and starchy vegetables. The EAT-Lancet Commission describes the planetary health diet as a "flexitarian diet, which is largely plant-based but can optionally include modest amounts of fish, meat and dairy foods."

Response
The UK newspaper The Guardian and US news outlet CNN have given the diet positive coverage.

Harry Harris, writing in New Statesman, was wary of claims that the diet could transform the world's food system, saying, “It seems churlish to keep placing the onus for climate change onto individual's [sic] behaviour, when we know that 100 companies are responsible for 71 per cent of global emissions."

The World Health Organization withdrew its sponsorship of the EAT-Lancet event following criticism from Gian Lorenzo Cornado, Italy's representative to the Geneva international organizations. Cornado said that adopting one dietary approach for the whole planet would destroy traditional diets and cultural heritage, and that reducing meat and candy consumption would cause the loss of millions of jobs.

In 2019, Francisco J. Zagmutt and colleagues challenged the planetary diet based on flaws in the methodology used for health estimates. However, as pointed out by Walter Willett, the three different methods that were used to estimate the number of preventable deaths among adults were published independently of the EAT-Lancet Commission with a detailed methodology.

Cost 
The cost of this diet is less than what some people spend now, and more than what other people can afford.

The planetary diet was challenged by Adegbola T. Adesogan and colleagues in 2020 who wrote that sustainability-oriented diet plans, such as the planetary diet, do not solve the problems of the women and children who are currently too poor to regularly eat meat, eggs, and dairy products, and whose health would benefit from introducing animal-source foods.

Researchers from the International Food Policy Research Institute and Tufts University calculated that nearly 1.6 billion people, mostly located in sub-Saharan Africa and South Asia, could not afford the cost of the EAT-Lancet reference diet.

A 2020 study found that the planetary diet is more affordable than the typical Australian diet.

Comparison with recommended diet patterns
A 2020 comparison study found that there are agreements between the planetary diet and the 2015-2020 Dietary Guidelines for Americans. The differences are in the recommended amounts of fruit, nuts, red meat, seeds, starchy vegetables and whole grains.

A 2020 comparison study of the average Indian diet with the planetary diet found that the average Indian diet is considered unhealthy because of excessive consumption of cereals and processed foods with not enough protein, fruits, and vegetables.

References

External links
Five Questions on EAT-Lancet

Diets
Environmental impact of agriculture
Food and the environment
Semi-vegetarianism
Sustainable food system
Climate change and agriculture